Fast Freddie, The Widow and Me is a 2011 one-off Christmas television special, made by STV Studios and broadcast by ITV on Tuesday 27 December 2011. The story centres on a wealthy car dealer who befriends a terminally ill teenager and makes his Christmas wish come true.

Plot 
Jonathan Donald (Laurence Fox) is a wealthy car dealer who, having been convicted of drink driving, is sentenced to 60 hours of community service at The Moonbeam Club for young adults who have social and behavioural difficulties.

At the club, Jonathan meets recently widowed Laura Cooper (Sarah Smart) but Laura doesn't like Jonathan's attitude towards the club and soon tells him to leave. Having failed to meet the terms of his sentence, Jonathan is forced to return by the court, with the sentence extended to 100 hours, and soon befriends 19-year-old Freddie Copeland (Jack McMullen), a gadget expert at the club. Jonathan learns that Freddie is dying of kidney failure and a genetic heart condition and that this Christmas could be his last. Freddie wishes for a family Christmas so Jonathan sets up a plan to help him, much to Laura's despair. Jonathan tracks down Freddie's real mother but she refuses to accept that she is Freddie's mother so Jonathan alters his plan and, with the help of Jonathan's best friend Charlie, Laura's mother Julia and some criminals led by fraudster Patsy Morgan (Tamzin Outhwaite), Jonathan makes Freddie's wish come true. Freddie dies in hospital after Christmas so Laura, Jonathan and The Moonbeam Club put his ashes into fireworks and set them off on 12 April as Freddie's last wish comes true.

Cast 
 Laurence Fox as Jonathan Donald
 Jack McMullen as Freddie Copeland
 Sarah Smart as Laura Cooper
 Tamzin Outhwaite as Patsy Morgan
 David Westhead as Charlie
 Marian McLoughlin as Julia
 Davood Ghadami as Alex
 Vahid Gold as Mark
 Faye Daveney as Natasha
 Calvin Demba as Terry
 Larrisa Toussiant-Grant as Kate
 Judy Flynn as Cathy
 Debra Baker as Susie Copeland
 Ann Beach as Grandma
 Reece Beaumont as Peter
 Bill Paterson as Judge Underwood
 Ruth Kearney as Stacey

Notes

References
https://web.archive.org/web/20120426125703/http://www.itv.com/fastfreddie/
http://www.imdb.com/title/tt2147283/
http://www.metro.co.uk/tv/885548-laurence-fox-fast-freddie-the-widow-and-me-is-more-than-a-parable
http://www.mirror.co.uk/tv/tv-previews/fast-freddie-the-widow-and-me---itv1-98755
http://www.independent.co.uk/arts-entertainment/tv/reviews/last-nights-viewing-great-expectations-bbc1-fast-freddie-the-widow-and-me-itv1-6281992.html
http://www.tv.com/shows/fast-freddie-the-widow-and-me/cast/
https://web.archive.org/web/20110728023106/http://www.itv.com/presscentre/pressreleases/programmepressreleases/fastfreddiethewidowandme/default.html
https://web.archive.org/web/20160304091116/http://www.locatetv.com/tv/fast-freddie-the-widow-and-me/7389716/cast
http://screenterrier.blogspot.co.uk/2011/06/fast-freddie-widow-and-me.html

External links
Fast Freddie, The Widow and Me at stv.tv

2011 television specials
ITV (TV network) original programming
Television series by STV Studios